Barnyard Commandos is an action figure line created by toy designer James Groman for American Greetings Corporation and produced by Playmates Toys in 1989. A thirteen-episode French-American animated series was based on the figures the following year. Produced by Murakami-Wolf-Swenson and the French company IDDH. It features the vocal talents of S. Scott Bullock, Thom Bray, Pat Fraley, Paul Hreppel, John Mariano, Bob Ridgely, Lennie Weinrib, and Danny Wells. However, the series was not successful enough to merit further production of episodes.

The property is based around the concept of farm animals who consumed radioactive materials left over from an abandoned military experiment, mutating them into hyper-intelligent, anthropomorphic paramilitary troops. This consists of two "hilariously harmless" opposing teams: the R.A.M.S. (Rebel Army of Military Sheep) and the P.O.R.K.S. (Platoon of Rebel Killer Swine).

On June 19, 2020, it was announced CloudCo with partner Megalopolis Toys will make new Barnyard Commandos figures.

Action figures
Two series of Barnyard Commandos were produced, each including several figures from both teams. Similar to Mattel's Food Fighters, the figures are non-poseable and made of soft, hollow plastic much like squeaky toys. They each include a weapon accessory that fastens onto the figure and a brief, humorous character description on the cardback.

Burger King also produced a series of tie-in toys as Kids' Meal premiums.

Series 1

R.A.M.S.
 Sergeant Woolly Pullover
 Commodore Fleece Cardigan
 Major Legger Mutton
 Pilot Fluff Pendleton

P.O.R.K.S.
 General Hamfat Lardo
 Private Side O'Bacon
 Sergeant Shoat N. Sweet
 Captain Tusker Chitlins

Series 2

R.A.M.S.
 Master Sergeant Cornelius Cannonfodder
 Private Bull Bellwether
 Commander Missiles Muttonchop
 Lieutenant Sureshot Shearling

P.O.R.K.S.
 Corporal Hy Ondahog
 Staff Sergeant Blaster McBacon
 Major Piggyback Gunner
 Captain Hogg Wilde

Vehicles
 Bacon Bomber
 Pork Chopper
 Pork-A-Pult
 Ram Tank

Home video
Only four episodes of the series were released to four NTSC VHS tapes with one episode each.
 Apple-Calypse Now
 Back to the Farm
 Treasure of Ram Pork Mountain
 Ultimate Quest

References

External links
Virtual Toy Chest - Barnyard Commandos
Barnyard Commandos at the Internet Movie Database

Action figures
1980s toys
1990s toys
American children's animated comedy television series
1990 American television series debuts
1990 American television series endings
1990s American animated television series
First-run syndicated television programs in the United States
Playmates Toys